Julia Rucklidge is a Canadian-born clinical psychologist who is the director of the Mental Health and Nutrition Research Group at the University of Canterbury in New Zealand.  Her research has centered on mental health and nutrition.

Biography
Rucklidge received her Bachelor of Science at McGill University in 1992. She went on to earn both her Masters of Science and PhD at the University of Calgary between 1995 and 1998. Rucklidge's PhD explored the psychological functioning of women identified in adulthood with Attention-Deficit/Hyperactivity Disorder.

Rucklidge emigrated to New Zealand in 2000 to take up a lecturer position at the University of Canterbury (Christchurch). She continued to work in clinical roles in addition to academic work, at the Canterbury District Health Board and The Charity Hospital (Christchurch). Rucklidge was appointed the Director of the Clinical Training Programme at University of Canterbury between 2001 and 2004 and again between 2014 and 2016.

Rucklidge's original academic work focused on psychological and neurocognitive functioning in Attention-Deficit/Hyperactivity Disorder in both children and adults. She published widely in the area and is cited over 1000 times for this work.  Today, Rucklidge's is more widely known for her research on mental health and nutrition. She became interested in this area after she was approached by a Canadian family who were using nutrients to treat their children with Bipolar Disorder.

Rucklidge is currently the director of the Mental Health and Nutrition Research Group (University of Canterbury). Work from this research group has explored the impact of nutritional interventions in Attention-Deficit/Hyperactivity Disorder in children and adults, anxiety and stress in adults and children following a series of earthquakes, insomnia, premenstrual syndrome, depression, addictions and emotion dysregulation.

Ongoing work in the Mental Health and Nutrition Research Group includes trials to explore the impact of nutritional interventions on maternal mental well-being, infant development and anxiety and depression.

In the media
Rucklidge emphasises the importance of nutrition in mental health through her Facebook page, Twitter account and blog ‘Mad in America’. She has been featured in various New Zealand news articles and magazines.

Rucklidge created a free educational series for the public in collaboration with Professor Bonnie Kaplan and in 2014 presented a TEDx talk which has had over 4.1 million views as at June 2022. However, TED has flagged that Rucklidge's talk has fallen outside of TEDx's curatorial guidelines because it oversimplifies interpretations of legitimate studies

Awards and professional achievements
In 2015, Rucklidge was the recipient of the Ballin Award, recognising significant contributions to the development and enhancement of clinical psychology in New Zealand. She was also named one of the most influential women in New Zealand in 2015 and 2018.

Rucklidge was awarded the Toronto French School Alumni of Distinction Award/Le prix de distinction des anciens élèves in 2017 and in 2018 she received a Braveheart Award recognising her courage, innovation and her effort to improve the lives of people in her community.

Notable publications

General media articles
 "Are micronutrients the answer to NZ's mental health crisis?"
 "Julia Rucklidge: Natural Health Bill a bitter pill for nutrient sector"
 "Food for thought: can nutrients nurture better mental health?"
 "Supplements benefit mental health, With Julia Rucklidge"

References

External links

Mental Health and Nutrition Research Group website

Year of birth missing (living people)
Place of birth missing (living people)
Living people
Academic staff of the University of Canterbury
New Zealand psychologists
New Zealand women psychologists
Canadian psychologists
Canadian women psychologists
McGill University alumni
University of Calgary alumni
Canadian emigrants to New Zealand